The stripey (Microcanthus strigatus), also known as the footballer or convict fish, is a species of ray-finned fish, a sea chub from the subfamily Microcanthinae which is part of the family Kyphosidae. It is native to the Pacific Ocean where it has a wide range. This species may be found in the aquarium trade.  It is the only known member of its genus.

Taxonomy
The stripey was first formally described as Chaetodon strigatus in 1831 by the French zoologist Georges Cuvier with the type locality given as Nagasaki. It is the only species in the genus Microcanthus which was named by the English zoologist William John Swainson in 1839. Some authorities have suggested that there may be as many of three species within the taxon currently knows as Microcanthus strigatus but this not widely accepted.

Description
The stripey has a deep, compressed body which has a rounded back, it has a distinctive pattern of oblique black and yellow, sometimes white, stripes. The stripes extend onto the dorsal and anal fins, and there is a black stripe which runs from the forehead to just to the rear of the eye.

Distribution
The stripey is found in the Pacific Ocean where it has a disjunct distribution with a northern and a southern population. The northern population is found from Japan and Taiwan to Hawaii and the southern population is found along the east and west coasts of Australia, around Lord Howe Island and off New Caledonia. The Australian distribution runs from central Queensland to southern New South Wales, although it may extend as far as eastern Victoria and the north east of Tasmania, and from Cape Leeuwin to the Exmouth Gulf in Western Australia.

Habitat and biology
The stripey occurs in coastal and lagoon reefs where during the day it forms dense schools which hide under ledges and in caves. It feeds on small crustaceans and algae. Juvenile stripets are often seen in tidal pools while the adults may be seen around man-made structures such as jetties and harbour walls. They may enter brackish water.

Aquarium
The stripey is occasionally found in the aquarium trade.

References

External links 
 

Microcanthinae
Fish described in 1831
Taxa named by Georges Cuvier